The 1915 Franklin & Marshall football team was an American football team that represented Franklin & Marshall College during the 1915 college football season. The team compiled a 6–2 record and outscored opponents by a total of 188 to 43. John M. Reed was the head coach.

Schedule

References

Franklin and Marshall
Franklin & Marshall Diplomats football seasons
Franklin and Marshall football